A by-election was held for the Australian House of Representatives seat of Port Adelaide on 26 March 1988. This was triggered by the resignation of Labor Party MP Mick Young over alleged mishandling of campaign donations.

The election was won by Labor candidate Rod Sawford, despite an 11.1% swing to the Liberal Party.

The 1988 Adelaide by-election had occurred just seven weeks earlier.

Candidates

Independent – Tony Chaplin.
Independent – Michael Brander, representing the unregistered National Action.
Liberal Party of Australia – Judy Fuller.
Australian Labor Party – Rod Sawford, a local teacher.
Independent – Bruce Deering.
Australian Democrats – Meg Lees, previously Democrats candidate for Barker in 1983 and 1984 and third South Australian Senate candidate in 1987. Lees was appointed to the Senate in 1990 after Janine Haines's resignation, and later became leader of the Democrats before leaving the party in 2003 to form the Australian Progressive Alliance.
Independent – Ruby Hammond, indigenous rights campaigner. Hammond was the first indigenous person to seek election to the federal parliament in South Australia.
Independent – Jocelyn Aver.

Results

See also
 List of Australian federal by-elections

References

Port Adelaide by-election
South Australian federal by-elections
Port Adelaide by-election, 1988
Port Adelaide by-election